TVNZ Sport Extra was a temporary sports television station in New Zealand, operated by TVNZ. Broadcasting on channel 20 on Freeview, it showed live and delayed free-to-air coverage of selected events. Eric Kearley, TVNZ's Digital Launch Manager, has stated there was no further plans for this channel until the 2008 Summer Olympics.

Programming
Sport Extra had originally launched to show the V8 Supercars Series live. TVNZ however lost the rights to this at the end of the 2007 season to TV3.

2007
 V8 Supercars Series (Live)
 FIFA Under-20 World Cup (Delayed)
 AFC Asian Cup (Live)

2008
 2008 Beijing Olympics

2009
 ASB Classic & Heineken Open (live, extended coverage)
 Louis Vuitton Pacific Series (live coverage and highlights)
 FA Cup (Semi-final, and final replays and highlights)
 IRB International Rugby Board Junior Cup
 Confederations Cup (New Zealands games and Final replay)
 Wimbledon World Tennis tournaments held in London

Channel Future
The broadcast of TVNZ Sport Extra was terminated on NZST 10:00pm, 1 August 2009 to allow for increased capacity across other TVNZ digital channels, however the 2009 global recession has been blamed for the lack of resources maintained by TVNZ. TVNZ later launched a similar channel, TVNZ Pop-up in 2015. For the 2018 Commonwealth Games, TVNZ launched TVNZ Games Extra and TVNZ Games Online.

Sister Channels

TVNZ Sport Extra was one of the six channels owned and operated by TVNZ. It was also the only TVNZ channel available exclusively on the Freeview platform.

 TV One
 TV2
 TVNZ 6 (closed, became TVNZ U (closed), now TV2 + 1)
 TVNZ 7 (Closed, became TV One Plus 1 (shifted), now TV One + 1)
 TVNZ Heartland (now defunct)
 TVNZ Kidzone24 (now defunct)

References

Defunct television channels in New Zealand
Television channels and stations established in 2007
Television channels and stations disestablished in 2009
English-language television stations in New Zealand